Grunge is a genre of music.

Grunge may also refer to:

 Grunge (comics), a teenage comic book super-hero and a member of Gen¹³
 Grunge.com, a website on weird history, entertainment, science, and sports
 Johnny Grunge, a ring name of professional wrestler Michael Lynn Durham (1966–2006)
 Grunge, Norway, a village in Vinje municipality in Telemark, Norway

See also 
 Grunge lit, an Australian literary genre
 Grunge speak, a hoax reported by the New York Times
 Post-grunge, a music genre